Chris Sanford (born March 12, 1968) is an American retired mixed martial artist who has competed in the Ultimate Fighting Championship and World Extreme Cagefighting. He appeared on the first season of The Ultimate Fighter.

Background
Sanford was born in Roxbury, Boston. He lived in Japan as a high school exchange student and also studied Japanese language and economics at the University of Massachusetts, Amherst.

He practiced various forms of martial arts, like taekwondo, kung fu and boxing.

Mixed martial arts career

Early career: World Extreme Cagefighting
Sanford started his mixed martial arts career in 2001. He fought mainly for California–based promotions as World Extreme Cagefighting and Gladiator Challenge.

He amassed a perfect record of four victories and no defeats before being signed to compete on the original season of The Ultimate Fighter.

The Ultimate Fighter
Sanford signed in to compete as a middleweight and was the last middleweight pick of Team Couture. However, he never fought on the show, as he was sent home by Couture in the second episode after his team lost the team challenges.

Ultimate Fighting Championship
Despite being eliminated early on the show, he was awarded a chance to fight at The Ultimate Fighter 1 Finale against fellow housemate Josh Koscheck. He was knocked out at 4:21 in the first round and was subsequently released from the promotion.

Return to WEC
Sanford faced Josh Green on August 18, 2005 at WEC 16. He won via submission due to a guillotine choke in the very first round.

Sanford never fought again since 2005.

Mixed martial arts record

|-
|Win
|align=center|5–1
|Josh Green
|Submission (guillotine choke)
|WEC 16: Clash of the Titans 2
|
|align=center|1
|align=center|2:30
|Lemoore, California, United States
|
|-
|Loss
|align=center|4–1
|Josh Koscheck
|KO (punch)
|The Ultimate Fighter 1 Finale
|
|align=center|1
|align=center|4:21
|Las Vegas, Nevada, United States
|
|-
|Win
|align=center|4–0
|Desi Miner
|Submission (choke)
|Fearless 1
|
|align=center|1
|align=center|N/A
|Pasig, Metro Manila, Philippines
|
|-
|Win
|align=center|3–0
|Jack Cardenas
|Submission (armbar)
|WEC 6: Return of a Legend
|
|align=center|1
|align=center|2:45
|Lemoore, California, United States
|
|-
|Win
|align=center|2–0
|Travis Robinson
|Submission (heel hook)
|Gladiator Challenge 6: Caged Beasts
|
|align=center|1
|align=center|1:54
|Colusa, California, United States
|
|-
|Win
|align=center|1–0
|Bobby Martin
|KO (punch)
|WEC 1: Princes of Pain
|
|align=center|2
|align=center|0:29
|Lemoore, California, United States
|

References

External links
 
 

1968 births
Living people
Sportspeople from Boston
American male mixed martial artists
Mixed martial artists from Massachusetts
Light heavyweight mixed martial artists
Mixed martial artists utilizing wushu
Mixed martial artists utilizing boxing
Mixed martial artists utilizing taekwondo
People from Roxbury, Boston
American wushu practitioners
American male taekwondo practitioners